Yago Felipe da Costa Rocha (born 13 February 1995), known as Yago Felipe, is a Brazilian footballer who plays for Bahia as a midfielder.

Club career
Born in Limoeiro do Norte, Ceará, Yago joined Figueirense's youth setup in 2011, after spells with Flamengo and Botafogo. He also had a trial period at RCD Espanyol, but nothing came of it.

On 9 November 2014 Yago made his Série A debut, coming on as a second-half substitute in a 1–0 home win against state rivals Chapecoense. He was made a starter by manager Argel Fucks in the following year.

In April 2019, he joined Goiás on loan until the end of 2019.

Honours
Figueirense
Campeonato Catarinense: 2014, 2015

Fluminense
Campeonato Carioca: 2022

References

External links
 
 

1995 births
Living people
Sportspeople from Ceará
Brazilian footballers
Association football midfielders
Campeonato Brasileiro Série A players
Figueirense FC players
Esporte Clube Vitória players
Goiás Esporte Clube players
Fluminense FC players
Esporte Clube Bahia players